Blues metropolitano is a 1985 Italian musical comedy-drama film directed by Salvatore Piscicelli.

Cast 
Marina Suma: Stella
Ida Di Benedetto: Elena
Barbara D'Urso: Francesca
Stefano Sabelli: Tony Tarallo
Tony Esposito: Tanino
Paolo Bonetti: Gigino Giordano
Maurizio Capone: Tex
James Sampson: Solomon
Pino Daniele: himself 
Tullio De Piscopo: himself
Stefano Sarcinelli

See also  
 List of Italian films of 1985

References

External links

1985 films
Italian comedy-drama films
Films directed by Salvatore Piscicelli
1985 comedy-drama films
1980s Italian-language films
1980s Italian films